The jungle prinia (Prinia sylvatica) is a small passerine bird, a warbler in the family Cisticolidae.

Distribution and habitat
This prinia is a resident breeder in Bangladesh and India, far southwestern Nepal and Sri Lanka, typically found in dry open grassland, open woodland, scrub and sometimes gardens.

Description

In breeding plumage, adults are grey-brown above, with a short white supercilium and warmer brown rump. There are rufous fringes on the closed wings and white edges to the tail. Underparts are whitish-buff. The sexes are identical except that the male has a blacker bill and mouth in the breeding season.

In winter, the upperparts are a warmer brown, and the underparts more buff. The tail is longer than in summer. There are a four races differing in plumage shade.  The distinctive endemic race in Sri Lanka,  P. s.valida, retains summer plumage, including the shorter tail, all year round, and lacks the supercilium and white in the tail.

Behaviour
Like most warblers, the jungle prinia is insectivorous. It builds its nest in a shrub or tall grass and lays 3–5 eggs. The song is a repetitive pit-pretty, pit-pretty, pit-pretty.

References

 Warblers of Europe, Asia and North Africa by Baker, 
 Birds of India by Grimmett, Inskipp and Inskipp, 

jungle prinia
Birds of India
Birds of Sri Lanka
jungle prinia